The 1956 Campeonato Nacional de Fútbol Profesional, was the 24th season of top-flight football in Chile. Colo-Colo won their seventh title.

Scores

Standings

Topscorer

References

External links
ANFP 
RSSSF Chile 1956

Primera División de Chile seasons
Primera
Chile